The 1978 Notre Dame Fighting Irish football team represented the University of Notre Dame as an independent during the 1978 NCAA Division I-A football season. Led by fourth-year head coach Dan Devine, the Fighting Irish compiled an overall record of 9–3. Notre Dame was invited to the Cotton Bowl Classic, where the Irish beat Houston, 35–34, after quarterback Joe Montana rallied the team from a 22-point deficit in the fourth quarter. The team played home games at Notre Dame Stadium in Notre Dame, Indiana.

Schedule

Personnel

Game summaries

Michigan

The Reunion Game - first meeting between the two schools in 35 years
Notre Dame wore green jerseys for the game

Pittsburgh

    
    
    
    
    
    
    

Notre Dame handed #9 Pittsburgh its first loss of the season. Jerome Heavens, who had never seen Knute Rockne, All American, surpassed George Gipp on the school's all-time rushing list. Heavens passed Gipp on his 24th carry but lost yardage on his 25th before moving pass him for good on his 26th attempt. "I think the Gipper tackled me on that," Heavens said.

Cotton Bowl

The Cotton Bowl win over Houston on New Year's Day was Notre Dame's 600th victory.

References

Notre Dame
Notre Dame Fighting Irish football seasons
Cotton Bowl Classic champion seasons
Notre Dame Fighting Irish football